The Franklin B. Jenkins House is a historic house at 37 Chestnut Street in Stoneham, Massachusetts.  Built c. 1895, it is one of Stoneham's finest Queen Anne Victorian houses.  The -story wood-frame house has an L shape, with a distinctive octagonal turret section at the crook of the L. A porch with turned posts and balusters wraps around the front and side to the turret section.

The house was listed on the National Register of Historic Places in 1984, where it is listed at 35 Chestnut Street.  It was also included in the Nobility Hill Historic District in 1990.

See also
Franklin B. Jenkins House (2 Middle Street, Stoneham, Massachusetts), also NRHP-listed in Stoneham
National Register of Historic Places listings in Stoneham, Massachusetts
National Register of Historic Places listings in Middlesex County, Massachusetts

References

Houses on the National Register of Historic Places in Stoneham, Massachusetts
Queen Anne architecture in Massachusetts
Houses completed in 1895
Houses in Stoneham, Massachusetts
Historic district contributing properties in Massachusetts